The 2017 Engie Open Andrézieux-Bouthéon 42 was a professional tennis tournament played on indoor hard courts. It was the seventh edition of the tournament and part of the 2017 ITF Women's Circuit, offering a total of $60,000 in prize money. It took place in Andrézieux-Bouthéon, France, from 23–29 January 2017.

Singles main draw entrants

Seeds 

 1 Rankings as of 16 January 2017

Other entrants 
The following players received wildcards into the singles main draw:
  Manon Arcangioli
  Lou Brouleau
  Chloé Paquet
  Harmony Tan

The following players received entry from the qualifying draw:
  Magdalena Fręch
  Bernarda Pera
  Bibiane Schoofs
  Dayana Yastremska

The following player received entry as a lucky loser:
  Akgul Amanmuradova

Champions

Singles

 Anett Kontaveit def.  Ivana Jorović, 6–4, 7–6(7–5)

Doubles

 Nicola Geuer /  Anna Zaja def.  Ana Bogdan /  Ioana Loredana Roșca, 6–3, 2–2 ret.

External links 
 2017 Engie Open Andrézieux-Bouthéon 42 at ITFtennis.com
 Official website 

2017 in French tennis
2017 ITF Women's Circuit
2017